Borya is a genus of  flowering plants in the family Boryaceae, endemic to Australia.

, the World Checklist of Selected Plant Families accepted 11 species: The Western Australia Flora lists nine current taxa.

 Borya constricta Churchill - Western Australia
 Borya laciniata Churchill - Western Australia
 Borya longiscapa Churchill - Western Australia
 Borya nitida Labill. - Recherche Archipelago, Western Australia 
 Borya scirpoidea Lindl. - Western Australia
 Borya sp. Wheatbelt (A.S. George 16470) 
 Borya sphaerocephala R.Br. - Western Australia
 Borya stenophylla M.D.Barrett  - Western Australia 
 Borya subulata G.A.Gardner - Western Australia
 Borya jabirabela Churchill - Northern Territory
 Borya septentrionalis F.Muell. - Queensland
 Borya inopinata P.I.Forst. & E.J.Thomps. - Queensland 
 Borya mirabilis Churchill - Victoria

References

Boryaceae
Endemic flora of Australia
Asparagales genera
Asparagales of Australia
Taxa named by Jacques Labillardière